This article describes a discography, released by Russian alternative rock band Jane Air. It includes 6 studio albums, 10 singles and 20 music videos.

Junk

Junk (also known as Jazz-funk) is a single released by Jane Air in 2003, as well as the eponymous song that first appeared in the album Pull Ya? Let It Doll Go! (2002). The song has music video and movie. The main idea of the song is the harm of using drugs by young people (presented in satirical form). In 2005 Jane Air was awarded for the song «Junk» with the prize RAMP ("Russian Alternative Music Prize") established by A-One channel, in the category «Song of the year».

The lyrics of the song have been written already in 2000.

The song was used for the ending credits of the Amazon Prime series "The Boys," for the season 3 episode "Glorious Five Year Plan."

Music video
The video was shot in 2003 directed by "Deviant creations". At the beginning is shown a child with his mother playing with a red ball. Than in video appears frontman of the band - Anton Lissov, who is playing a role of drug addict. Also in the video are present two guys  smoking at the stairs (symbolise smoke addiction), big company of people at the party (symbol of drunkenness and alcohol addiction), the woman (who is infected with AIDS and gonorrhea) and also at the chorus appear all members of Jane Air, who are playing in the room and then in the garage. At the end of the song another member of the band is lying in the yard (dead from an overdose of drugs).

The video is mixed with live performance at the concert.

Track list
 "Junk" (album version) – 3:28
 "Junk" (video version) – 3:25
 "Кровь и Молоко" – 3:16
 "Злое Солнце" – 4:14
 "Обрывки" (garage version) – 1:47

Nevesta

Nevesta (The bride) is a song, released by Jane Air from the album Sex And Violence released in 2007. The song has music video.

Lyrics
The lyrics were written in 2006. It is a mystical story about dead newlyweds who are together in the same grave.

Music video
At the beginning are shown members of the band who are drinking champagne in a limousine. Then the car delivers them to a big stage at the countryside of Saint Petersburg and the band starts playing the music. At the same time appear a great number of zombies (and zombie-bride) which are bugging out of the ground. At the end of the video zombies begin to attack the members of the band.

Other facts
During the first 10 seconds at the video is playing Jane Air song "Superzvezda".

Lyubit' Lyubov'

Lyubit Lyubov (to love the Love) is the single and EP released by Jane Air in 2011. The single includes 3 songs and 1 music video.

Music video
The video was shot by director "Alexey/MAV/Medyantsev" and presented in 2011. During the whole video is shown a man who is riding a bicycle in the city. At the fourth minute he stops at the bridge and is shown as blindfolded with a bandage with a label "Любить любовь". And then appear much more blindfolded people on motorcycles which follow the main hero.

Track list
 1. ЗВВЗС (ZVVZS)
 2. Любить Любовь (To love the Love)
 3. Пламя Огня (The flame of fire)

References

Discographies of Russian artists